Platz may refer to:

People 
 David Platz (born 1929), German-British music producer
 Elizabeth Platz, American Lutheran pastor
 Eric Platz (born 1973), American drummer
 Greg Platz (born 1950), Australian rugby league footballer
 Gustav Adolf Platz (1881-1947), German architect
 Hans Platz (1919-1988), German chess player
 Joseph Platz (1905 – 1981), German–American chess master
 Lew Platz,  (fl. 1952), Australian rugby league footballer
 Paul Platz (born 1920), Canadian  ice hockey  left winger
 Reinhold Platz (1886-1966), German aircraft designer and manufacturer
 Robert H.P. Platz (born 1951), German composer
 Tom Platz (born 1955), American professional bodybuilder

Places 
 Platz, the German name for the municipality of Místo, Ústí nad Labem, Czech Republic
 Platz an der Naser, the German name for Stráž nad Nežárkou, South Bohemia, Czech Republic
 Platz, Graubünden, a place in the Swiss canton of Graubünden
 Platz der Luftbrücke, a city square and transport node in Berlin, Germany

Other uses 
 Plätze in Städten, a 1998 German drama film
 Toyota Platz, a small car

German-language surnames